Eudocia, or possibly Eudocias, was an ancient town in Phrygia Pacatiana. Its current location is unknown.

The Synecdemus of Hierocles mentions four towns in Asia Minor called Eudocia, including one in Phrygia Pacatiana.

References

Populated places in Phrygia
Lost ancient cities and towns
Former populated places in Turkey